Stadion der Freundschaft could refer to one of the following stadiums:

 Stadion der Freundschaft (Cottbus)
 Stadion der Freundschaft (Frankfurt (Oder))
 Stadion der Freundschaft (Gera)
 Stadion der Freundschaft (Stralsund)